The 2006 Porsche Carrera Cup Great Britain was the fourth season of the one-make championship. It consisted of 20 rounds, beginning on 8 April at Brands Hatch and finishing on 15 October at Silverstone. The series supported the British Touring Car Championship throughout the season. Damien Faulkner won his second consecutive title, ahead of Tim Harvey and Danny Watts.

Changes for 2006
 The 997 model 911 GT3 replaced the 996.
 Races were approximately 55% longer than in 2005.
 The Pro-Am class for non-professional drivers was introduced.

Entry List
 All drivers raced in Porsche 911 GT3s.

Calendar & Winners
All races were held in the United Kingdom (excepting Mondello Park round that held in Ireland).

Championship Standings
Points were awarded on a 20, 18, 16, 14, 12, 10, 9, 8, 7, 6, 5, 4, 3, 2, 1 basis to the top 15 finishers in each race, with 1 point for the fastest lap in each race and 1 point for pole position in the first race of each meeting.

External links
 Porsche Carrera Cup Great Britain

Porsche Carrera Cup GB
Porsche Carrera Cup Great Britain seasons